Juan Pastor, O.M. (died 1664) was a Roman Catholic prelate who served as Bishop of Crotone (1638–1664).

Biography
Juan Pastor was ordained a priest in the Order of the Minims.
On 30 August 1638, he was appointed during the papacy of Pope Urban VIII as Bishop of Crotone.
On 12 September 1638, he was consecrated bishop by Francesco Maria Brancaccio, Cardinal-Priest of Santi XII Apostoli, with Tommaso Carafa, Bishop of Vulturara e Montecorvino, and Giovanni Battista Altieri, Bishop Emeritus of Camerino, serving as co-consecrators. 
He served as Bishop of Crotone until his death in 1664.
While bishop, he was the principal co-consecrator of Alfonso de la Cueva-Benavides y Mendoza-Carrillo, Cardinal-Bishop of Palestrina (1644).

References

External links and additional sources
 (for Chronology of Bishops) 
 (for Chronology of Bishops) 

17th-century Italian Roman Catholic bishops
Bishops appointed by Pope Urban VIII
1664 deaths